The Lisbon Community School District is a rural public school district headquartered in Lisbon, Iowa.

The district spans eastern Linn County, western Cedar County, with smaller areas in Jones and Johnson counties.  It serves the city of Lisbon and the surrounding rural areas.

Pat Hocking has been the superintendent since 2013.

Schools
The district operates three schools, all in one facility in Lisbon:
 Lisbon Elementary School
 Lisbon Middle School
 Lisbon High School

Lisbon High School

Athletics
The Lions participate in the Tri-Rivers Conference in the following sports:
Football
2011 Class 1A State Champions
Cross Country
 Boys' 2005 Class 3A State Champions (as Mt. Vernon-Lisbon)
 Girls'  2008 Class 3A State Champions (as Mt. Vernon-Lisbon)
Volleyball
Basketball
Wrestling
 14-time State Champions (1973, 1974, 1975, 1977, 1978, 1980, 1982, 1983, 1986, 1988, 1989, 1990, 1992, 1993) 
 3-time State Duals Champions (1987, 1988, 1991)
Golf
Track and Field
 Girls' 3-time State Champions (1985, (2009, 2010 as Mt. Vernon-Lisbon))
Soccer 
Baseball
 1994 Class 1A State Champions 
Softball
 3-time Class 1A State Champions (1994, 1995, 1996)

See also
List of school districts in Iowa
List of high schools in Iowa

References

External links
 Lisbon Community School District

School districts in Iowa
Education in Linn County, Iowa
Education in Cedar County, Iowa
Education in Jones County, Iowa
Education in Johnson County, Iowa